Charles Narrey (1825 in Becques, Nord – 1892 in Paris)  was a 19th-century French writer and playwright from an Irish family arrived in France following James II of England.

Narrey made his debut in 1847 with both a novel, Deux heures de mystères, and two comedies performed at the Théâtre de l'Odéon, Les Notables de l'endroit (in 3 acts) and En bonne fortune (1 act). From 1853 until 1856, he was one of the administrators of this theatre.

Narrey wrote a certain number of plays for different theatres, sometimes in collaboration with M. Michel : Le Passé et l'avenir (Odéon, 1847), Van Dyck à Londres (Odéon, 1848), Les Tribulations d'une actrice (Théâtre des Variétés, 1857), La Dame de trèfle, Les Fantaisies de Milord, Georges Brummel, La Femme à la broche, La Bohême d'argent,  Le Moulin ténébreux,  La Cigarette,  Les Marionnettes de Justin etc.

In addition, he also published Le Quatrième Larron in 1861, Ce que l'on dit pendant une contredanse (1863), Les Amours faciles (1866), Les Derniers Jeunes Gens,  Le Bal du diable etc.

His last work was a more humorous than philological fantasy entitled Voyage autour du dictionnaire published in 1892.

External links 
 Charles narrey on 

19th-century French dramatists and playwrights
People from Nord (French department)
1825 births
1892 deaths